Cupel may refer to:
A porous pot used in cupellation
Cupel, Białobrzegi County in Masovian Voivodeship (east-central Poland)
Cupel, Legionowo County in Masovian Voivodeship (east-central Poland)
Cupel, Ostrołęka County in Masovian Voivodeship (east-central Poland)